Northwest Arabian Arabic (also called Levantine Bedawi Arabic or Eastern Egyptian Bedawi Arabic) is a proposed subfamily of Arabic encompassing the traditional Bedouin dialects of the Sinai Peninsula, the Negev, southern Jordan, and the northwestern corner of Saudi Arabia.

The dialect of the Maʿāzah in the Egyptian Eastern Desert borders the dialect of the ʿAbābdah, who speak a dialect more closely related to Sudanese Arabic. Research is needed to establish whether the Maʿāzah dialect is the southwestern extremity of Northwest Arabian on the Egyptian mainland.

In Saudi Arabia, the dialects of the eastern coast of the Gulf of Aqaba, the Hisma, and the Harrat al-Riha belong to the Northwest Arabian type, but the dialect of the Bili to the south is not closely related.

Classification 
The Northwest Arabian Arabic dialects display several innovations from Proto-Arabic:

 The voiced reflex of *q ([g])
 The gaháwah syndrome: insertion of /a/ after X in (C)aXC(V) sequences where X is /h/, /ʿ/, /ḥ/, /ġ/, or /ḫ/, e.g. gahwa(h) > gaháwa(h) "coffee", baġl > baġal "mule".
 The definite article al- and the relative pronoun alli are stressable as an integral part of the word, e.g. álwalad, áljabal. The initial /a/ is stable enough to be preserved after -ī (-iy), which is dropped: f-albēt, rāʿ-álġanam.
 A number of typical Bedouin lexical items (gōṭar "to go", sōlaf "to tell, narrate", ṭabb "to arrive", nišad ~ nišád "to ask").
Absence of tanwīn and its residues.
 Absence of final /n/ in the imperfect, 2nd person feminine singular, 2nd person masculine plural, and 3rd person masculine plural.
 The pronominal suffix of the 2nd person masculine plural is -ku (-kuw).
Stressed variants -ī and -nī of the pronominal suffix in the 1st person singular.
 Plural comm. forms haḏalla, haḏallāk, etc.
 Initial /a/ in Forms VII, VIII, and X in the perfect, and stressed when in stressable position.
 Initial /a/ in a number of irregular nouns (amm, aḫt, aḫwan, adēn, afám).

Varieties 
Northwest Arabian Arabic can be divided into a western branch spoken in Sinai and the Negev, and an eastern branch spoken to the east of the Wadi Araba. The differences between the western and eastern branches are as follows:

 In the eastern branch, the b- imperfect does not occur in plain colloquial, while in the entire western branch it is in regular use.
 The western branch makes use of an analytic genitive, šuġl, šuġlah, šuġlīn, šuġlāt as genitive markers.
 The western branch dialects have vowel harmony in the performative of the active imperfect of Form I, whereas in the eastern branch the vowel is mainly generalized /a/.
 In the dialects of the eastern branch and southern Sinai, the reflexes of *aw and *ay are well-established monophthongs /ō/ and /ē/, usually after back consonants and emphatics as well. In most dialects of the western branch, *aw and *ay have been partially monophthongized, but the new monophthongs fluctuate with long phonemes /ō/ ~ /ū/, /ē/ ~/ī/.
 The eastern branch dialects tend to (but not strictly) drop the initial /a/ in gaháwah forms: ghawa ~ gaháwa, nḫala, etc. In Sinai and Negev, the /a/ of the initial syllable is preserved.
 The imperfect of the I-w verbs in the western branch are of the type yawṣal, yōṣal, whereas in the eastern branch they are of the type yāṣal.
 3rd person singular feminine object suffix: -ha/-hiy in Negev, -ha everywhere else.
 3rd person singular masculine object suffix: C-ah in the eastern branch, phonetically conditioned C-ih/-ah in the western branch, C-u(h) in southern Sinai.
 1st person plural common subject pronoun: ḥinna, iḥna in the eastern branch; iḥna, aḥna in the western branch.
 In the eastern branch and parts of Sinai, -a is the main reflex of -ā(ʾ) in neutral environments. In Negev and the eastern part of the northern Sinai littoral, it is -iy, in back environments -a.

Phonology

Consonants 

 Phonemes in parentheses occur either marginally or across different dialects

  is mostly heard in the Hindiy and Ṭuwara dialects

Vowels 
Vowels occur in both long and short positions:

Vowels are recognized as allophones in the following positions:

Imala

Word-internal imala of */-ā-/ 
Some varieties of Negev Arabic are characterized by word-internal imala of *-ā- to /ē/ in patterns where /i/ historically occurred in an adjacent syllable. It does not occur when one of the adjacent consonants is emphatic or a back consonant. Some of the patterns where it is found include the following:

 Reflexes of *CāCiC: šēyib “elder, old man”, ḥēmiy “hot”, gēyil “having said”, bēkir “morning”, wēḥid “one”, ṯēniy “second”
 Reflexes of *CiCāC(ah): srēǧ “oil lamp”, ktēbih “writing”
 Reflexes of *miCCāC(ah): miftēḥ “key”, miknēsih “broom”
 Broken plurals *CaCāCiC: gibēyil “tribes”, šinētiy “bags”
 Imperfect *yuCāCiC: ysēwiy “it equals”, yǧēwib “he replies”

Word-final imala of */-ā(ʾ)/ 
Some of the western dialects of Northwest Arabian Arabic (Central Sinai and Negev in particular) are characterized by an Imala of Old Arabic word-final *-ā(ʾ) to /iy/ in certain patterns of nouns and adjectives. Emphatics seem to block the shift. The following examples are from Negev Arabic:

 Reflexes of *CiCāʾ, *CuCāʾ: štiy “rainy season”, ḥḏiy “footwear”, dʿiy “cursing”, ndiy “call”, zniy “adultery”, ġniy “song”, ʿšiy “evening prayer”, dliy “pails (pl.)”, mliy “full (pl.)”, rwiy “well-watered (pl.)”, miy “water”
 Reflexes of *CiCā, *CuCā: lḥiy “beards”, griy “hospitality”, hdiy “right guidance”, hniy “here”
 Reflexes of *CiCCā(ʾ), *CuCCā(ʾ): yimniy “right side”, yisriy “left side”, sifliy “nether millstone”, ʿilyiy “upper millstone”, miʿziy “goats”, ḥimmiy “fever”, ḥinniy “henna”, juwwiy “inside”, ḥiffiy “barefoot (pl.)”, mūsiy “Moses”, ʿīsiy “Jesus”
 Feminine adjective *CaCCāʾ: sawdíy “black”, ṭaršíy “deaf”, tarjíy “sloping downwards (ground)”, šahabíy “grey, light blue”, ḥawwíy “salt-and-pepper, black with white spots (animal)”, zargíy “blue”, ʿawjíy “crooked”, šadfíy “left-handed, left”, ḥawlíy “cross-eyed”, safʿíy “black-eared (goat)”
 Broken plural *CaCCā: nōmiy “asleep (pl.)”, mōtiy ~ máwtiy “dead (pl.)”
In the dialects of southern Sinai, word-final imala typically results in /iʾ/. Some examples are íštiʾ “winter”, ǧiʾ “he came”, ḏiʾ “this, these”, tižibhiʾ “you get it”, ifṭarniʾ “we had breakfast”. In some, but not all groups, /a/ in a previous syllable blocks this imala. Like the dialects of central Sinai and Negev, the imala of feminine adjectives of color and defect on the pattern CaCCāʾ results in stressed /íy/: sōdíy “black; bad”.

Characteristics 
The following are some archaic features retained from Proto-Arabic:

 Gender distinction in the 2nd and 3rd person plural pronouns, pronominal suffixes, and finite verbal forms.
 Productivity of Form IV (aC1C2aC3, yiC1C2iC3).
 The initial /a/ in the definite article al- and the relative pronoun alli.
Frequent and productive use of diminutives (glayyil "a little", ḫbayz "bread").
Absence of affricated variants of /g/ (< */q/) and /k/.
 The use of the locative preposition fi (fiy).
The invariable pronominal suffix -ki of the 2nd person feminine singular.

See also 
 Varieties of Arabic
 Peninsular Arabic

References

Sources

 Haim Blanc.  1970. "The Arabic Dialect of the Negev Bedouins," Proceedings of the Israel Academy of Sciences and Humanities 4/7:112-150.
 Rudolf E. de Jong. 2000. A Grammar of the Bedouin Dialects of the Northern Sinai Littoral: Bridging the Linguistic Gap between the Eastern and Western Arab World. Leiden: Brill.
 Judith Rosenhouse.  1984. The Bedouin Arabic Dialects: General Problems and Close Analysis of North Israel Bedouin Dialects.  Wiesbaden:  Harrassowitz.

Sinai Peninsula
Arabic languages
Languages of Israel
Languages of Egypt
Languages of Jordan
Languages of the State of Palestine
Languages of Saudi Arabia
Bedouin Arabic
Levantine Arabic
Mashriqi Arabic